Darja Švajger (born 16 June 1965 in Maribor, SR Slovenia, SFR Yugoslavia) is one of Slovenia's most popular singers, perhaps best known internationally for having represented her country in the Eurovision Song Contest on two occasions.

Early life 
Music entered Darja's life when she was still a child. After finishing secondary school, she entered the College of Music and attended art classes in Graz, Austria, where she studied classical solo singing and jazz. In 1997, she graduated magna cum laude. Already during her studies she had started performing as a solo vocalist with various bands and symphony orchestras. Since 1992 she has been engaged in several projects of the Slovene National Theatre in Maribor. In 1993, the international jury of the Melodies of the Sea and the Sun pop music festival, held in Koper, awarded her first prize in the Slovenian section of the international category. Her first album, In the Arms of the Night, soon followed.

Albums 
 1994: V objemu noči
 1995: Prisluhni mi
 1998: Trenutki
 1999: Še tisoč let
 2001: Plameni
 2005: Najlepše uspešnice
 2008: Moji obrazi
 2013: Moji obrazi

Eurovision 1995 
The year 1995 was of great importance to Darja. She represented Slovenia in the Eurovision Song Contest in Dublin, performing the song Prisluhni mi ("Listen to me") by Primoc Peterca and Saso Fajon. The ballad achieved seventh place: Slovenia's best ever result to the contest. Darja won the 1995 and 1996 Pop Singer of the Year awards in Slovenia. In the following years, she became very active and her second album, Moments, was released in 1998.

Official music videos 
 1995: Prisluhni mi
 1999: Še tisoč let / For a thousand years
 2014: Sončen dan
 2015: En svet

Eurovision 1999
In 1999, Darja again won Slovene national selection for Eurovision and therefore was selected to represent the country in the Eurovision Song Contest held in Jerusalem. Peterca and Fajon again wrote a ballad for her, entitled For A Thousand Years. The composer stated that he had been inspired by the city of New York during his four-month stay there. Slovene broadcaster RTV had high hopes and indeed the song was in first place at the beginning of the voting: it even got a highest score of 12 points from Ireland and Croatia. The song finally scored a total of 50 points and was ranked 11th among the 23 entries.

See also
Slovenia in the Eurovision Song Contest

External links

The official site of the Slovenian National Broadcaster
The official site of the Eurovision Song Contest

1965 births
Eurovision Song Contest entrants of 1995
Eurovision Song Contest entrants of 1999
Living people
Musicians from Maribor
Eurovision Song Contest entrants for Slovenia
20th-century Slovenian women singers
Slovenian jazz singers
Slovenian pop singers
21st-century Slovenian women singers